"Till I Found You" is a song by American contemporary Christian musician Phil Wickham. The song was released on April 27, 2018, as the second single from his seventh studio album, Living Hope (2018). It impacted Christian radio on March 15, 2019. Wickham co-wrote the song with Travis Ryan, and collaborated with Ran Jackson, Ricky Jackson and Nicolas Balachandran in the production of the single. The song peaked at No. 9 on the US Hot Christian Songs chart.

Background
On April 27, 2018, Phil Wickham released "Till I Found You" as the second single from Living Hope, an album which slated for release in August 2018, along with its accompanying lyric video. Wickham shared the story behind the song, saying: 

In partnership with Spotify, Phil Wickham released Spotify Singles, a two-song collection recorded at the Sound Stage in Nashville, Tennessee which included a re-imagined version of "Till I Found You" and a cover of Louis Armstrong's "What a Wonderful World" on October 24, 2018. The song was released to Christian radio on March 15, 2019.

Composition
"Till I Found You" is an electronic R&B song, composed in the key of E major with a tempo of 124 beats per minute. Wickham's vocal range spans from C4 to B5.

Music videos
The lyric video of "Till I Found You" was published on Phil Wickham's YouTube channel on April 27, 2018. The official music video of the song was then availed on May 17, 2018. The live performance video for the "House Sessions" rendition was released on February 15, 2019, to YouTube. On May 6, 2019, he Singalong 4 live performance video of the song was availed on YouTube.

Track listing

Charts

Weekly charts

Year-end charts

Release history

References

External links
 

2018 singles
Contemporary Christian songs
Phil Wickham songs
Songs written by Phil Wickham